TLV may refer to:
 Tel Aviv, Israel
Ben Gurion Airport, Tel Aviv, Israel, IATA code
 Banca Transilvania, Romania, BVB stock exchange symbol
 Threshold limit value for a chemical substance
 TLV mirror, Han dynasty, China
 Type–length–value, data communications encoding
 Total liquid ventilation
 The Swedish Dental and Pharmaceutical Benefits Agency, government agency
 Tree of Life Version, a Messianic Jewish version of the Bible